Since 1893, there have been a number of general strikes in Belgium. Occasioned by the emergence of the labour movement and socialism in Belgium, general strikes have been an enduring part of Belgian political life. Originally intended to encourage the reform of the franchise, more recent strikes have focused on issues of wages and opposition to government austerity. Since 1945, general strikes have been co-ordinated by the General Federation of Belgian Labour (ABVV-FGTB), a federation of Socialist trade unions, while most before World War II were organised by the parliamentary Belgian Labour Party (POB-BWP).

According to Carl J. Strikwerda, the Belgian general strike of 1893 was the first general strike in the European history.

Origins
In 1866, the Belgian government revoked the articles of the Le Chapelier Law which had outlawed trade unions. The first strikes followed soon after. A mining strike occurred in 1868 and textile workers went on strike during the economic depression of the 1870s. In 1885, the Belgian Labour Party, the country's first socialist parliamentary party, was formed. Despite the rapid growth of the labour movement, during the nineteenth century Belgian workers were known internationally for their low pay and poor working conditions.

The first major strike in Belgian history was the Belgian strike of 1886 which, though unorganised, led to the first legislation regarding working conditions.

List

See also

Strike of the 100,000 - a notable strike in German-occupied Belgium in 1941
Misère au Borinage (1933) - Socialist film looking at the living conditions in the Borinage after the 1932 strike
Belgium in the long nineteenth century

Notes

Bibliography

Further reading

External links

De grootste stakingen uit de Belgische geschiedenis at De Standaard
General Strikes and Social Change in Belgium (1980) by Carl Strikwerda 

 
Social history of Belgium
Socialism in Belgium
Labour in Belgium